Hespereburia is a genus of beetles in the family Cerambycidae, containing the following species:

 Hespereburia balouporum Tavakilian & Monné, 1991
 Hespereburia blancheti Dalens & Tavakilian, 2009
 Hespereburia brachypa Bates, 1870

References

Hesperophanini